The South Ugie Water is a tributary of the Ugie Water in northeastern Aberdeenshire, Scotland.  To the south of the Ugie Water are a number of prehistoric monuments, evidencing the habitation of early man in the northeast of Scotland; for example, the Catto Long Barrow and a number of tumuli are situated in this locale.

Course
The river is sourced from many places, however all of the minor tributaries conjugate between the Warterhill of Buxie and Old Deer. 
The river then moves East North East passing through/near - 
Stuartfield
Mintlaw
Inverquhomery
Longside
Millbank
and then flows into North Ugie Water, which then turns into the River Ugie as it conjugates with South Ugie Water.

See also
 Laeca Burn

Line notes

References
 United Kingdom Ordnance Survey Map (2004) 1:50,000 scale, Landranger series
 C.Michael Hogan (2008) Longman Hill, Modern Antiquarian 

Rivers of Aberdeenshire
Tumuli in Scotland